Snopków  is a village in the administrative district of Gmina Jastków, within Lublin County, Lublin Voivodeship, in eastern Poland.
The population of Snopków was 928 in 2011.

References

Villages in Lublin County